The 2018 ATP Challenger China International – Nanchang was a professional tennis tournament played on hard courts. It was the fourth edition of the tournament which was part of the 2018 ATP Challenger Tour. It took place in Nanchang, China between 16 and 22 April 2018.

Singles main-draw entrants

Seeds

 1 Rankings are as of 9 April 2018.

Other entrants
The following players received wildcards into the singles main draw:
  Gao Xin
  He Yecong
  Wu Yibing
  Xia Zihao

The following players received entry from the qualifying draw:
  Chung Yun-seong
  Antoine Escoffier
  Hugo Grenier
  Shuichi Sekiguchi

The following player received entry as a lucky loser:
  Sasikumar Mukund

Champions

Singles

 Quentin Halys def.  Calvin Hemery 6–3, 6–2.

Doubles

 Gong Maoxin /  Zhang Ze def.  Ruben Gonzales /  Christopher Rungkat 3–6, 7–6(9–7), [10–7].

References

2018 ATP Challenger Tour
2018